Invitation Only may refer to:

Invitation Only (film) Taiwanese horror film
Invitation Only (album) album by Mickey Gilley
Invitation Only, album by Will Downing 1997
Invitation Only (Fabulous Thunderbirds video album)

See also
By Invitation Only album by Michael Schenker Group